2017 Denmark Open is a darts tournament, which will take place in Esbjerg, Denmark on April 28 and 29, 2017. Darius Labanauskas is the defending champion.

References

2017 in darts
2017 in Danish sport
Darts in Denmark